Tiracola grandirena is a moth of the family Noctuidae first described by Gottlieb August Wilhelm Herrich-Schäffer in 1868. It is found from Mexico to Venezuela, as well as on Cuba, Jamaica and Puerto Rico.

References

Hadeninae
Moths of North America
Moths of the Caribbean
Moths of Central America
Moths of South America
Moths of Cuba
Lepidoptera of Brazil
Lepidoptera of Jamaica
Insects of Puerto Rico
Moths described in 1868